The F Line is one of seven RapidRide lines (routes with some bus rapid transit features) operated by King County Metro in King County, Washington. The F Line began service on June 7, 2014, running between the Burien Transit Center and "The Landing" in north Renton. Other major stops and destinations served include Tukwila International Boulevard Link Station, Southcenter Mall, Tukwila Sounder/Amtrak Station, South Renton Park and Ride, Renton Transit Center and the Boeing Renton Factory. Unlike most of the RapidRide lines, the F Line does not offer scheduled service during late-night and early morning hours.

History
This corridor was previously served by Metro routes 110 and 140, with the latter carrying 3,500 riders on an average weekday in April 2014  With the implementation of RapidRide, the corridor saw an overall 69 percent increase in service, and ridership has grown 47 percent, with the F Line serving an average of 5,600 riders on weekdays in June 2015.

Service

All times are estimated headways.

References

External links
F Line website
RapidRide website
RapidRide Blog
King County Metro
Prototype bus photo sets on Flickr
From Oran Viriyincy
From user Citywalker
From usermajinandoru

Bus transportation in Washington (state)
Transportation in King County, Washington
Transportation in Seattle
2014 establishments in Washington (state)
2014 in transport
King County Metro